The Hammering Process is the fifth album by the Christian metal band Living Sacrifice. This is the first album to feature percussionist Matthew Putman, guitarist Rocky Gray and bassist Arthur Green. The making of this album was featured in the Processed Tour DVD.

The song, "New Day", was written and recorded for this album, however, by the time the mixing came about, the band could not find the track. In 2010, while recording the process for The Infinite Order, the band discovered the lost track, with the song debuting in 2017, on a benefit compilation We Bear the Scars, for Timothy Henderson (formerly of Warlord).

Track listing
 "Flatline" – 3:20
 "Bloodwork" – 4:14
 "Not My Own" – 3:12
 "Local Vengeance Killing" – 3:07
 "Altered Life" – 4:46
 "Hand of the Dead" – 3:33
 "Burn the End" – 4:58
 "Hidden" – 3:52
 "Perfect" – 2:53
 "Conditional" – 5:00

Credits
Living Sacrifice
Bruce Fitzhugh – vocals, rhythm guitar
Lance Garvin – drums
Rocky Gray – lead guitar
Arthur Green – bass
Matthew Putman – percussion, vocals

Production
Barry Poynter – producer

References

2000 albums
Living Sacrifice albums
Solid State Records albums